Buy may refer to a trade, i.e., an exchange of goods and services via bartering or a monetary purchase. 

The term may also refer to:

Places
Buy (inhabited locality), any of several inhabited localities in Russia
Burlington-Alamance Regional Airport, FAA airport code "BUY"
Buy (river), a river in Perm Krai and the republics of Bashkortostan and Udmurtia in Russia
Bunbury Airport, IATA airport code "BUY"

Other uses
Buy (album), 1979 album by James Chance and the Contortions
Buy, slang for believe, find credible, be convinced
Buy.com, a shopping website founded in 1997; renamed Rakuten.com in 2010

See also
 Acquisition (disambiguation)
 Bui (disambiguation)
 Bouy (disambiguation)
 Buoy (disambiguation)
 Procurement
 Purchase (disambiguation)
 Purchasing
 Trade (disambiguation)